The Ambassador Extraordinary and Plenipotentiary of the Russian Federation to Finland is the official representative of the President and the Government of the Russian Federation to the President and the Government of Finland.

There is a consulate general in Turku, and consuls in Mariehamn and Kuusamo.

History of diplomatic relations

The territory now making up present-day Finland was contested between Russians and Swedes for much of the seventeenth and eighteenth centuries, until the Finnish War of 1808-1809 established the Grand Duchy of Finland as an autonomous part of the Russian Empire. Finland had her own parliament, the Diet, minted her own currency, and shared a customs border with Russia. The Finnish language was given official status alongside Russian and Swedish.

Finland declared independence on 6 December 1917, after the Russian Revolution that year, a decision which was ratified by the Russian government on 31 December 1917. The declaration soon sparked a civil war between White and Red factions. The Russian Soviet Federative Socialist Republic (RSFSR) appointed representatives to the Red faction during the war, until their defeat. Relations were then established between the Finnish government and the RSFSR at the level of missions on 31 December 1920. With the formal establishment of the Soviet Union, diplomatic relations were maintained between the USSR and Finland from 23 July 1923 onwards.

Diplomatic relations between the two states were broken off several times during the twentieth century. The first came on 29 November 1939 with the outbreak of the Winter War between the USSR and Finland. With the negotiated conclusion to the war, diplomatic relations resumed on 12 March 1940. Relations were once more interrupted on 22 June 1941, with the Axis invasion of the Soviet Union and Finland's participation on the Eastern Front against Soviet forces as part of the Continuation War. With the defeat of the Axis powers in the Second World War, diplomatic relations were once more reestablished on 6 August 1945, and on 18 July 1954 the mission was upgraded to the level of an embassy. Following the dissolution of the Soviet Union in 1991, Finland recognized the Russia Federation as its successor state on 30 December 1991, and ambassadors have continued to be exchanged between the two countries.

List of representatives (1917 – present)

Representatives of the Russian Soviet Federative Socialist Republic to Finland (1917 – 1923)

Representatives of the Union of Soviet Socialist Republics to Finland (1923 – 1991)

Representatives of the Russian Federation to Finland (1991 – present)

References

 
Finland
Russia